The Romney Deanery is in the Diocese of Canterbury in Kent, England.

Churches within the Deanery:

External links 
 Official site
 Diocese of Canterbury 

Diocese of Canterbury